Thirukkovaiyar is a Shivite work composed by Manikkavacakar. Dated to the 9th century CE, the work is part of the 12-volume Tirumurai and, along with Thiruvasakam, is traditionally placed as the 8th volume of the Tirumurai. The work is also known as "Tiruchitrambalakkovaiyar."

The work

 
Known as "Aaranam" among Shivite scholars, which translates to "Vedas," the work consists of 400 verses. The work is divided into 25 chapters. On a superficial view, the work may appear as part of the Tamil akam genre of poetry. The work was sung entirely in Thillai Chidambaram.

Translations
In 1921, an English translation of Manikkavacakar's hymns was done by Francis Kingsbury and GE Phillips, both of United Theological College, Bangalore (Edited by Fred Goodwill) and published in a book as Hymns of the Tamil Śaivite Saints, by the Oxford University Press

References

External links
 Shaivam.org
 Ecstasy of Spirit: Recital by Siddhar Maha Siva Swamy & benediction

Hymns
Shaiva texts
Shaivism
Tamil-language literature
Bhakti movement